Earl Park may refer to
Earl Park, Indiana, a town in Richland Township, Benton County, Indiana, United States.
Earl Park, Arncliffe, a former sports field in Sydney, Australia